Colin Hardman (24 February 1947 – 8 July 2006) was a British motorcycle racer who competed in both the solo and sidecar classes.

Biography
Nicknamed "Cocker", Hardman was born in St Helens, Lancashire and was the younger brother of the rugby league player, Alan Hardman.

Racing career

Solo Racing

1974–1981
Inspired by motorcycle racers such as Geoff Duke, Hardman began his solo racing career in 1966 on a Triumph at Croft, subsequently competing at the Aintree Motor Racing Circuit and Cadwell Park amongst others, before making his debut on the Isle of Man at the 1974 Manx Grand Prix where he competed in the Lightweight  race, securing 52nd place on board a Ducati.

Returning to the Isle of Man in 1975 he again campaigned a Ducati in the Lightweight Manx Grand Prix, improving on his maiden appearance taking his machine home in 37th place. Hardman next competed at the 1979 Manx Grand Prix and continued his participation at the 1980 and 1981 meetings; however he posted retirements in all three races.

1985–1993
Although concentrating primarily on sidecar racing at this time, Hardman resumed competing on solo machinery at the 1985 Manx Grand Prix which saw him entered in the Junior race competing on a Yamaha. By the mid-1980s the Manx Motorcycle Club had introduced the format of classic racing to the Manx Grand Prix programme, and Hardman was able to compete in the class on a Suzuki, although in 1985 he failed to finish in both races he entered.

Fortunes were mixed at the 1986 meeting with Hardman forced to retire whilst competing on a Rotax in the Lightweight class. However a relative upturn in fortune occurred in the Junior Classic in which he managed to finish in 20th place, although this was followed by further retirements at the 1987 and 1988 meetings.

From 1988 Hardman did not compete again on solo machinery until 1992, however two further retirements accompanied his endeavors at the 1992 and 1993 races. After this Hardman no longer competed in the solo classes.

Sidecar Racing

1982–2006

Hardman switched to sidecar racing in 1982 and made his first appearance in the Sidecar TT as passenger for Brian Hargreaves. A disappointing retirement for Hargreaves and Hardman in the opening race was followed by a 14th-place finish in their second outing (the event is raced over two legs with the overall winner performing the best in terms of aggregate).

Hardman teamed up with highly experienced driver Dennis Keen for the 1983 Isle of Man TT which saw them become an established partnership. Campaigning a Yamaha outfit, disappointment featured in the opening race which resulted in a retirement, however they subsequently claimed their first top ten finish when 7th place was secured in the second sidecar race. At the 1984 TT a retirement again befell Keen and Hardman in the opening race, however the second race saw a credible 6th-place finish.
Hardman partnered Keen for a fourth consecutive season in 1986, and again they saw mixed results at the Isle of Man TT posting a retirement in the opening race before taking 8th place in the second race of the meeting.

Following his time partnering Keen, Hardman took the chair for Michael Burcombe which saw them finish in 13th place at the 1987 Sidecar Race 'A' followed by a retirement in the Sidecar Race 'B'.
A marked improvement in 1988 saw Burcombe and Hardman take their Ireson Yamaha home in 7th place in the sidecar 'A' race which in turn was followed up by 5th place in the 'B' race.

By 1989 Hardman was recognised as one of the leading sidecar passengers in the race paddock and this led to his partnership with Dave Molyneux. For the 1989 Sidecar Race 'A' the duo took their place on the starting grid at the TT Grandstand alongside pre-race favourites Mick Boddice and Chas Birks and experienced crews such as Kenny Howles and Steve Pointer; Lars Schwartz and Leif Gustavsson; and Dave Saville and Richard Crossley. This was followed by 3rd place in the Sidecar 'B' race where Molyneux and Hardman upped their average race speed to  allowing them to claim the Sidecar TT victory on aggregate over the two legs of the meeting.

The 1989 TT was the last time sidecars with an upper engine capacity of 1000 cc competed on the Snaefell Mountain Course. From 1990, formula racing was introduced to the Sidecar TT with engine capacity restricted to either 350 cc two stroke or 600 cc four stroke.

Following his success with Molyneux at the 1989 meeting, Hardman did not appear at the TT again until 1993 when he teamed up with Richard Crossley. Claiming a credible 6th place in their opening race, Crossley and Hardman then concluded the meeting when they took the 3rd place on the rostrum in Sidecar Race 'B'. Hardman was again absent from the TT in 1994 before going on to accompany Alan Warner at the 1995 and 1996 meetings. This partnership produced a somewhat poor return for Hardman, 13th place being the highlight in the Sidecar 'B' race at the 1996 Isle of Man TT.

Hardman joined up with the former Swedish Sidecar Champion Lars Schwartz for the 1997 season with the pair continuing their partnership until 2000. Although they failed to make the grid for the Sidecar Race 'A' at the 1998 TT, a series of solid performances saw only one retirement in the seven occasions in which the duo competed at the TT with five top twenty finishes claimed.

The 2001 Isle of Man TT Races were cancelled as a consequence of the Foot and Mouth outbreak in the United Kingdom with racing resuming in 2002, and which saw the winning duo of Molyneux and Hardman reunited. Two strong performances saw them take 4th place in the opening race, and conclude the meeting by taking 2nd place in the second of the two races. Hardman then teamed up with John Holden in 2003 where they enjoyed a brace of top ten finishes at the TT.

Missing the 2004 campaign, Hardman joined Gary Bryan in 2005. This partnership yielded a relatively low return at the 2005 TT where they were forced to retire in both races. The opening race of the 2006 TT saw Bryan and Hardman bring their outfit home in 5th position, however another retirement concluded their meeting.

Death
Following the TT, Bryan and Hardman continued their season at the Oliver's Mount circuit in Yorkshire. During a practice session their outfit crashed at the Esses section of the course, resulting in Hardman dying at the scene. As a result of the tragedy the sidecar race at the meeting was cancelled, with the crews undertaking a parade lap in honour of the memory of Hardman.

Hardman's funeral took place at St German's Cathedral, Isle of Man following which there was a private cremation at Douglas Borough Crematorium. His ashes were scattered on the Cronk-y-Voddy Straight, said to have been his favourite section of the TT Course. There is a memorial headstone commemorating him in Kirk Michael Parish Churchyard.

Private life
Hardman was twice married, with three children from his first marriage. Having lived for the early part of his life in St Helens, the family moved to the Isle of Man in 1977, where they made their home in Onchan.

Racing Statistics

TT Race Victories

Career summary

Isle of Man TT

Manx Grand Prix

Complete TT record

Complete Manx Grand Prix record

See also
 Sidecar TT
 Sidecar World Championship

Sources

References

External links
 TT database rider profile iomtt.com
 TT database TT results iomtt.com

1947 births
2006 deaths
Sportspeople from St Helens, Merseyside
British motorcycle racers
English motorcycle racers
Isle of Man TT riders
Motorcycle racers who died while racing
Sidecar racers